EHCC may refer to:

 European Hill Climb Championship
 Elayn Hunt Correctional Center, a prison in St. Gabriel, Louisiana